Scythris jansei is a moth of the family Scythrididae. It was described by Bengt Å. Bengtsson in 2014. It is found in Namibia, South Africa and Zimbabwe.

References

jansei
Moths described in 2014